The 1973-74 2nd Bundesliga season was the first season of the 2nd Bundesliga, the second level of ice hockey in Germany. 10 teams participated in the league, and ESV Kaufbeuren won the championship, and was promoted to the Ice hockey Bundesliga as a result. EV Ravensburg was relegated to the Oberliga

Regular season

References

External links
Season on hockeyarchives.info

2nd Bundesliga (ice hockey) seasons
2